No. 21 Group RAF is a former Royal Air Force group that existed from April-July 1918; 1926-1934, a redesignation of No. 1 Group RAF; after which it was merged into Inland Area; and from 1938 to 1955.

The group was transferred to Flying Training Command on 27 May 1940, responsible for the RAF College and the Service Flying Training Schools from the Midlands northwards. On 1 May 1947, the Group absorbed No. 91 Group RAF, of Bomber Command, taking over HQ No. 91 Group, Morton Hall, Swinderby. On 24 June 1953 the Group absorbed No. 54 Group RAF, which had been reformed 22 months earlier within Flying Training Command to control Initial Training Wings and Grading Schools. No. 21 Group disbanded on 1 March 1955.

Orders of battle

 November 1939
HQ at RAF Cranwell
 RAF Cranwell = RAF College
 RAF Montrose = No. 8 Flying Training School RAF
 RAF Grantham = No. 12 Flying Training School RAF
 RAF Kinloss = No. 14 Flying Training School RAF
 RAF Lossiemouth = No. 15 Flying Training School RAF
 RAF Yatesbury = Radio Direction School

 May 1941
HQ at Cranwell
 RAF Cranage = No. 2 School of Air Navigation RAF
 RAF Cranwell = RAF College Flying Training School & No. 2 Central Flying School RAF
 RAF Grantham = No. 12 Service Flying Training School RAF
 RAF Hucknall = No. 1 (Polish) Service Flying Training School RAF
 RAF Montrose = No. 8 Service Flying Training School RAF
 RAF Shawbury = No. 11 Service Flying Training School RAF
 RAF Ternhill = No. 5 Service Flying Training School RAF

 April 1942
HQ at Cranwell
 RAF Cranage = No. 2 School of Air Navigation RAF
 RAF Cranwell = RAF College Flying Training School
 RAF Grantham = No. 12 (Pilots) Advanced Flying Unit RAF
 RAF Hucknall = No. 25 Elementary Flying Training School RAF
 RAF Leconfield = No. 15 (Pilots) Advanced Flying Unit RAF
 RAF Montrose = No. 8 Service Flying Training School RAF & No. 2 Flying Instructors School RAF
 RAF Newton = No. 16 Service Flying Training School RAF
 RAF Ossington = No. 14 (Pilots) Advanced Flying Unit RAF
 RAF Shawbury = No. 11 (Pilots) Advanced Flying Unit RAF
 RAF Ternhill = No. 5 Service Flying Training School RAF
 RAF Watton = No. 17 (Pilots) Advanced Flying Unit RAF

 April 1943
HQ at Cranwell
 RAF Andover = No. 15 (Pilots) Advanced Flying Unit RAF
 RAF Cranwell = RAF College Flying Training School
 RAF Dalcross = No. 19 (Pilots) Advanced Flying Unit RAF
 RAF Grantham = No. 12 (Pilots) Advanced Flying Unit RAF
 RAF Hucknall = No. 25 (Pilots) Advanced Flying Unit RAF
 RAF Montrose = No. 2 Flying Instructors School RAF
 RAF Newton = No. 1524 (Beam Approach Training) Flight RAF
 RAF Ossington = No. 14 (Pilots) Advanced Flying Unit RAF
 RAF Peterborough = No. 7  (Pilots) Advanced Flying Unit RAF
 RAF Shawbury = No. 11 (Pilots) Advanced Flying Unit RAF
 RAF Sherburn-in-Elmet = Airborne Forces Experimental Establishment
 RAF Ternhill = No. 5 (Pilots) Advanced Flying Unit RAF
 RAF Watton = No. 17 (Pilots) Advanced Flying Unit RAF

 July 1944
HQ at Cranwell
 RAF Banff = No. 14 (Pilots) Advanced Flying Unit RAF, No. 1511 (Beam Approach Training) Flight RAF, No. 1542 (Beam Approach Training) Flight RAF
 RAF Calveley = No. 11 (Pilots) Advanced Flying Unit RAF
 RAF Cranwell = No. 17 Service Flying Training School RAF
 RAF Errol = No. 9 (Pilots) Advanced Flying Unit RAF
 RAF Hucknall = No. 25 Elementary Flying Training School RAF
 RAF Montrose = No. 2 Flying Instructors School RAF, No. 1518 (Beam Approach Training) Flight RAF, No. 1541 (Beam Approach Training) Flight RAF
 RAF Newton = No. 16 Service Flying Training School RAF, No. 1524 (Beam Approach Training) Flight RAF
 RAF Shawbury = Central Navigation School, No. 1534 (Beam Approach Training) Flight RAF
 RAF Sherburn-in-Elmet = Airborne Forces Experimental Establishment
 RAF Spitalgate = No. 12 (Pilots) Advanced Flying Unit RAF, No. 1544 (Beam Approach Training) Flight RAF, No. 1536 (Beam Approach Training) Flight RAF
 RAF Ternhill = No. 5 (Pilots) Advanced Flying Unit RAF
 RAF Wheaton Aston = No. 21 (Pilots) Advanced Flying Unit RAF
 RAF Bridleway Gate = No. 1511 (Beam Approach Training) Flight RAF

 July 1945
HQ at Spitatgate
 RAF Cranwell = No. 19 Flying Training School RAF
 RAF Hucknall = No. 25 Elementary Flying Training School RAF
 RAF Montrose = No. 1541 (Beam Approach Training) Flight RAF
 RAF Newton = No. 16 Service Flying Training School RAF
 RAF Peterborough = No. 7 Service Flying Training School RAF
 RAF Spitalgate = No. 17 Service Flying Training School RAF
 RAF Ternhill = No. 5 (Pilots) Advanced Flying Unit RAF
 RAF Wheaton Aston = No. 21 (Pilots) Advanced Flying Unit RAF

 April 1953
HQ at Morton Hall, Swinderby
 RAF Bishops Court = No. 3 Air Navigation School RAF
 RAF Hullavington = No. 1 Air Navigation School RAF
 RAF Shawbury = Central Navigation and Control School RAF
 RAF Swinderby = No. 201 Advanced Flying School RAF
 RAF Thorney Island = No. 2 Air Navigation School RAF
 RAF Lichfield = No. 6 Air Navigation School RAF

Notes

References 

021
Training units and formations of the Royal Air Force
Military units and formations established in 1918
Military units and formations disestablished in 1955